Trigger is an 2022 Indian Tamil-language action thriller film written and directed by Sam Anton and produced by Pramod Films and Miracle Movies. The film stars Atharvaa, Tanya Ravichandran and Arun Pandian in lead roles. The film's music and score is composed by Ghibran, with cinematography handled by Krishnan Vasant and editing done by Ruben.

This is second collaboration of Atharvaa and Sam Anton after the 2019 film 100. The film predominantly shot in Chennai and Hyderabad. The film was released in theatres on 23 September 2022 and received positive reviews from critics.

Plot 
Prabhakaran, a suspended cop, who has been posted in the Internal Affairs of Tamil Nadu Police Department (T.N.P.D) by the police commissioner, learns that Nisha, who is his brother Karthi's adopted daughter is kidnapped. While investigating, Prabhakaran learns about the modus operandi of the kidnappers and manages to track down the kidnapper's Audi car to a warehouse, where he attacks the kidnapper named Aadi and saves Nisha.

Prabhakaran admits Aadi to the hospital and uses him as a bait to capture the mysterious leader, Upon deducing this, the leader manages to kill Aadi despite surveillance by Prabhakaran and his team. As Prabhakaran starts digging the case, he learns that the kidnappings are connected to an attack at the police commissioner's office in 1993 by a gangster named Michael (who is Aadi's father and also the mysterious person), where he finds that his father Sathya Moorthy, a former SI and Alzheimer patient, had dealt with the case earlier. 

It is revealed that in 1993, Michael actually was running a human trafficking racket by asking his henchmen to pretend as parents and adopt the child in the orphanage, where they hand over the children to Michael after 3 years in exchange for money. However, a couple filed a complaint about Michael's illegal activities to Sathya Moorthy, who gathered evidence against him. When Sathya Moorthy reached the commissioner's office to provide the evidence, Michael attacked the commissioner's office where Sathya Moorthy was knocked in the process and lost his memory about the incident. Michael was arrested on petty charges, while Sathya Moorthy was suspended. 

After having learned about Prabhakaran's identity, Michael kidnaps 20 children and tells the parents to provide money for their safe return at a public restaurant. While Prabhakaran's team leader Deva and his team waits at the bar to nab them, Prabhakaran finds out that one of the adopted children's parents are actually Michael's henchmen where he ask his colleagues to protect the children at the orphanage. However, one of the colleagues Perumal gets killed while trying to protect the children. Prabhakaran arrives at the parents's house where he defeats Michael's henchmen and learns that Deva is in trouble and heads to the restaurant. 

In the restaurant, Prabhakaran realizes that Deva is also Michael's son and the mole in the police department. Michael and Deva escape while Prabhakaran is shot and left for dead, but survives. Nisha is kidnapped again, but Prabhakaran and his colleagues analyse the place where Michael is taking the children and tracks down the bus, but Nisha is not present. Sathya tracks down the concrete truck where Nisha is held and also kills Deva. Enraged, Michael arrives at Sathya Moorthy's house to kill him, but Sathya Moorthy shoots Michael to death and the children are safely brought back to the orphanage.

Cast
Atharvaa as Prabhakaran
Tanya Ravichandran as Janani, Prabhakaran's love interest
Rahul Dev Shetty as Michael
Arun Pandian as SI Sathya Moorthy, Prabhakaran's father
Munishkanth as Killi
Chinni Jayanth as Perumal
 Pradeep Benetto Rayan as Deva
Azhagam Perumal as police commissioner
Aranthangi Nisha as Revathi
Anbu Thaasan as Aashiq
Five Star Krishna as Karthi,  Prabhakaran's brother
Vinodhini Vaidyanathan as Shree, Karthi's wife
Seetha as Lakshmi, Prabhakaran and Karthi's mother
Baby Dhikshitha Diwakar as Nisha
Vikram Anand as Aadhi
Sampath Ram as DCP Karunakaran

Production
The film was tentatively titled as Atharvaa 17. On 15 November 2021, the film's official title was unveiled as Trigger. Tanya Ravichandran was cast in as the female lead opposite Atharvaa which marks their first collaboration while other actors and actresses like Arun Pandian, Munishkanth, Chinni Jayanth and Azhagam Perumal appear in other pivotal roles.

Music

Ghibran composed the soundtrack and background score of the film while collaborating with actor Atharvaa and director Sam Anton for first time. The lyrics for the songs are written by Bmac Mastermind and Mirchi Vijay. The audio rights were acquired by Think Music India. The first single "Scooby Doobaa" was released on 25 August 2022. The second single "Trigger-Theme Song" was released on 24 September 2022 after the film's release.

Release

Theatrical
The film was released theatrically on 23 September 2022. On 15 December 2021, the makers released a special glimpse of the film. The teaser of the film was released on 11 August 2022. The distribution rights of the film in Tamil Nadu were acquired by Rahul under the banner of Romeo Pictures. The trailer of the film was released on 10 September 2022.

Home media
The post-theatrical streaming rights and satellite rights of the film were sold to Aha and Colors Tamil respectively. The film was released digitally through the streaming platform on 14 October 2022.

Reception 

M. Suganth of The Times of India rated the film 3 out of 5 stars and wrote Sam Anton teams up with Atharvaa again to give us an almost edge-of-the-seat action thriller that has enough smartness to keep us hooked. Navein Darshan of Cinema Express gave the film 3 out of 5 stars and wrote "Trigger would have been the powerful entertainer it aspires to be if these characters were fleshed out well in a screenplay free of distractions." Ashwin Ram of Moviecrow rated the film 2.75 out of 5 stating that "Despite the lengthy narrative and logical errors, it’s a definitely watchable action thriller that has a lot of moments to like." Dinamalar rated the film 3 out of 5. Behindwoods rated the film 2.5 out of 5 stars and stated that "Trigger is a watchable action entertainer with a good social message." Thinkal Menon of OTT Play rated 2 out of 5 stars and wrote "Despite sufficient opportunities in hand to make an engaging action drama with ample dose of relatable emotions, makers couldn't cash in on it. The movie ends up as forgettable fare."

References

External links
 

2022 films
2020s Tamil-language films
Indian action films
Films scored by Mohamaad Ghibran
Films about child abduction in India